is the first-launched Japanese daily sports newspaper founded in 1946.

It has a circulation of 1,661,000, and is an affiliate newspaper of the Asahi Shimbun.

Companies and regions
Nikkan Sports News (Tokyo)
Tokyo HQ: 5-10, Tsukiji Sanchome, Chuo, Tokyo, Japan 
Hokkaido Nikkan Sports News (Hokkaido)
Hokkaido HQ: KN Building, 1-30, Kita-Sanjo-Higashi Sanchome, Chuo-ku, Sapporo, Japan
Nikkan Sports News West Japan (Osaka, Nagoya, Kyushu)
Osaka HQ: Hanshin Diamond Building, 14-24, Fukushima Sanchome, Fukushima-ku, Osaka, Japan
Nagoya HQ: Asahi Kaikan, 3-3, Sakae Itchome, Naka-ku, Nagoya, Japan
Seibu HQ: Fukuoka Asahi Building, 1-1, Hakata Ekimae Nichome, Hakata-ku, Fukuoka, Japan

See also 
 Nikkan Sports Film Award
 Nikkan Sports Drama Grand Prix

External links 
 Nikkan Sports website

Asahi Shimbun Company
Daily newspapers published in Japan
Sports newspapers published in Japan
Newspapers established in 1946
1946 establishments in Japan